Flaviflexus is a genus of bacteria from the family Actinomycetaceae. Species of Flaviflexus have antimicrobial activity.

References

Actinomycetales
Bacteria genera
Taxa described in 2013